The Weather Eye was a trade name for a Nash Motors-designed fresh-air system for automobile passenger compartment heating, cooling, and ventilating. The Nash "All-Weather Eye" was the first automobile air conditioning system for the mass market. The use of the Weather Eye name for automobile passenger heating and air conditioning systems continued in American Motors Corporation (AMC) vehicles.

The design principles of the Nash Weather Eye system are now in use by nearly every motor vehicle.

Conditioned Air System
In 1938, Nash Motors developed the first automobile heater warmed by hot engine cooling water, and using fresh air. This "Conditioned Air System" is characterized by a cowl-mounted outside air receiver that passes fresh air through a heater core utilizing hot engine coolant for a heat source. The Nash system also pioneered the use of slight pressurization within the passenger compartment to eliminate the infiltration of cold outside air during winter use. This was a fan-boosted filtered ventilation and heating for the passengers, not the modern meaning of an "air conditioning" system. Nash was also the first automobile to make use of a disposable filter in the air-intake to clean incoming air. 

This was the first car heater that used fresh air from the outside and it was advertised as "No dust to soil or spoil your trip! Nash’s automatic 'Weather Eye' gives you fresh air, free of dust…rain….insects…chilling drafts!" The Nash system was a major advancement compared to what was used up to that time: heating by recirculating the air inside the car.

A concurrent development, the Evanair-Conditioner was made by Evans Products Company as an aftermarket accessory and also available by Hupmobile on their 1938 and 1939 model cars.

Weather Eye
In 1939, Nash added a thermostat to its system, making it the first thermostatic automobile climate control system. The Weather Eye "was the first truly good heating and ventilating system." Additionally, defoggers (defrosters) were incorporated with the introduction of the 3900 series cars that year. 

The Nash HVAC system was designed by Nils Eric Wahlberg and it continues to be the basis for use in modern automobiles. Nash included the first automatic temperature control for the airside of the heating system with the thermostat sensing the temperatures of the incoming outside air, the heater's discharge, and interior of the car; so that a change in any of these three air temperatures resulted in an automatic adjustment to maintain passenger comfort. Nash's Conditioned Air System heater was now marketed as the "Weather Eye" and consumer sales literature explained that the thermostat's "mechanical eye" watched the weather, hence the name.

All-Weather Eye

 
In 1954, Nash-Kelvinator capitalized on its experience in refrigeration to introduce the automobile industry's first compact and affordable single-unit heating and air conditioning system optional for all Nash Ambassador, Statesman, and Rambler models. It was a true vapor-compression refrigeration system with a compact under the hood and cowl area installation. Combining heating, cooling, and ventilating, the new air conditioning system for the Nash cars was called the "All-Weather Eye".

The 1954 Nash models were the first American automobiles to have a front-end, fully integrated heating, ventilating, and air-conditioning system. This was the first mass market system with controls on the dash and an electrically engaged clutch. This "first true refrigerated air conditioner system" for automobiles was also compact and easily serviceable with all of its components installed under the hood or in the cowl area. With a single thermostatic control, the Nash passenger compartment air cooling option was described as "a good and remarkably inexpensive" system.

Entirely incorporated within the engine bay, the combined heating and cooling system had cold air for passengers enter through dash-mounted vents. Nash's exclusive "remarkable advance" was not only the "sophisticated" unified system, but also its US$345 price was significantly less than all the other systems. The optional air conditioning system offered by Oldsmobile cost $199 more and it weighed twice as much as the integrated Nash unit that added only .

A feature was the "desert only" setting on the A/C thermostat control, a position that typically ran the compressor continually. In humid environments, the evaporator will freeze up from the accumulating condensation if the compressor operates constantly, which will ultimately block airflow. Other temperature settings cycle the compressor to prevent this problem. Freeze up is not a concern in dry environments such as deserts, and this setting provides constantly cooled airflow into the passenger compartment.

American Motors

First as optional equipment and later as a standard feature, the Weather Eye system was continued by AMC after the merger of Nash-Kelvinator Corporation and Hudson Motor Car Company in 1954. A smaller version of AMC's famous Weather-Eye heater was included in the Metropolitan. Improved versions of the "Weather-Eye" heater, fresh-air ventilation was standard on every 1967 AMC Ambassador. 

Starting with the 1968 model year, all AMC Ambassadors models came with air conditioning as standard equipment, a feature that at that time still cost extra even on expensive luxury-market Cadillac, Lincoln, and Imperial models, as A/C that was included in a car's base price was only offered by Rolls-Royce and a few other expensive European cars. Although it was possible to delete this feature, including air conditioning made the Ambassadors "stand out in the crowded full-size market" and the marketing move resulted in increased sales. Effective advertising positioned the AMC Ambassador against the Chevrolet Impala and Ford Galaxie as an unfair comparison because neither of these direct competitors included air conditioning as standard. Instead, the Ambassador was pictured with a Rolls-Royce Silver Shadow because that was a car with standard air conditioning and further comparisons with it pointed out that the Ambassador offered more headroom.

The "Weather Eye" designation was in use for 40 years and was last applied on the 1977 AMC Hornet and the 1978 AMC Gremlin models.

References 

Automotive technologies
Automotive technology tradenames
American Motors
Nash Motors